Bisanakoppa is a village in Belagavi district in the southern state of Karnataka, India. As of 2011, the village has a population of 2,041.

References

Villages in Belagavi district